'Abdullah al-Harari (1906) – September 2, 2008) was a Harari  muhaddith and scholar of Islamic jurisprudence. He lived and taught in Beirut, Lebanon, and was the founder of Al-Ahbash, a Sufi religious movement.

History
Al-Harariyy was born in 1906 in Harar, Ethiopia.

In 1983, he founded Al-Ahbash, a Beirut-based organization also known as the Association of Islamic Charitable Projects (AICP). Al-Ahbash is a Sufi religious movement.  Due to the group's origins and activity in Lebanon, the Ahbash have been described as the "activist expression of Lebanese Sufism."

Al-Harariyy was one of the Ulama signatories of the Amman Message. Issued in 2004, the statement gives a broad foundation for defining Muslim orthodoxy. He was also licensed as a Shaykh by Al-Azhar University's branch in Lebanon.

Al-Harariyy died of natural causes on September 2, 2008, aged 102.

Views
Al Harariyy held controversial views regarding Muawiyah, Aisha, and others. He believed that they were wrong for rebelling against Rashidun Caliph Ali bin Abi Talib during the first fitna and he criticized them for it in his book, al-Dalil al-Sharʿi ʿala Ithbat man Qaatalahum ʿAli min Sahabi aw Tabiʿi, (The legal proof establishing the wrongdoings of the companions and successors whom Ali fought). This is a position that runs contrary to the orthodox Sunni view, which maintains neutrality in regard to disputes among companions.

References

External links
 Offical website
 'Abdullah al-Harari's page on Goodreads

Shafi'is
Asharis
Al-Ahbash
Ethiopian Sufis
Ethiopian Muslims
Sunni Sufis
Sunni imams
Sunni Muslim scholars of Islam
Mujaddid
Hadith scholars
People from Harari Region
Ethiopian emigrants to Lebanon
1910 births
2008 deaths
Critics of Ibn Taymiyya
Critics of Ibn al-Qayyim
Critics of Wahhabism